Elena Maganini is a film editor, best known for her work on the first season of Showtime TV drama series Dexter.

Life and career
Maganini started out working on commercials in Chicago, and then moved on to her first feature, Henry: Portrait of a Serial Killer, for which she was not only editor but also sound editor. On Henry: Portrait of a Serial Killer, she collaborated with John McNaughton, a teaming that continued through a series of projects, often themed around sexuality, such as Sex, Drugs, Rock & Roll, Mad Dog and Glory, Push, Nevada and 1998 thriller Wild Things. She was nominated for an award for the HBO miniseries If These Walls Could Talk, in the category of Outstanding Single Camera Editing for a Miniseries or Special.

She met the pinnacle of her career when she was contacted by episode director Michael Cuesta for Showtime TV drama series Dexter. She worked on 6 episodes of Dexter and won a Primetime Emmy Award in 2007 for Outstanding Single Camera Picture Editing for a Drama Series for the pilot episode, Dexter. The episodes she worked on were "Dexter", "Crocodile", "Popping Cherry", "Return to Sender", "Father Knows Best" and "Born Free". Elena explaining why she took the job for Dexter, said that she had always been drawn to darker features.

Filmography

References

External links

New York Times Movies
Fandango filmography

American film editors
Living people
American Cinema Editors
Year of birth missing (living people)
American women film editors
American television editors
Women television editors
21st-century American women